Asian may refer to:
 Items from or related to the continent of Asia:
 Asian people, people in or descending from Asia
 Asian culture, the culture of the people from Asia
 Asian cuisine, food based on the style of food of the people from Asia
 Asian (cat), a cat breed similar to the Burmese but in a range of different coat colors and patterns
 Asii (also Asiani), a historic Central Asian ethnic group mentioned in Roman-era writings
 Asian option, a type of option contract in finance
 Asyan, a village in Iran

See also
 
 
 East Asia
 South Asia
 Southeast Asia
 Asiatic (disambiguation)